Kasethan Kadavulada is an upcoming Indian Tamil-language heist comedy film produced and directed by R. Kannan. It is a remake of the 1972 Tamil film of the same name. The film stars Shiva, Priya Anand, and Yogi Babu, with Urvashi, Karunakaran, Sivaangi Krishnakumar, Pugazh, Thalaivasal Vijay and Manobala in supporting roles. It revolves around a man collaborating with two men to steal money from his stepmother.

Principal photography began in July 2021 and ended by the following August within 35 working days. The film remains unreleased due to legal and financial issues.

Premise 
Three men: Ramu, Babu and Ramu's cousin, collaborate to steal money from Ramu's stepmother.

Cast 
 Shiva as Ramu
 Priya Anand as Shakthi
 Yogi Babu as Babu
 Urvashi as Ramu's stepmother
 Karunakaran as Ramu's cousin
 Sivaangi Krishnakumar as Sakthi
 Pugazh as the hacker
 Thalaivasal Vijay as Ramu's father
 Manobala
 VTV Ganesh as a doctor

Production 
On 7 July 2021, R. Kannan announced he would be remaking the 1972 Tamil film Kasethan Kadavulada, directing and producing the remake under his banner Masala Pix, with MKRP Productions co-producing. As part of the announcement, Shiva would play the lead role originally done by R. Muthuraman, with Yogi Babu and Urvashi reprising the roles by originally portrayed Thengai Srinivasan and Manorama. Principal photography began on 16 July, along with the announcement that Priya Anand and Karunakaran would be reprising the roles originally played by Lakshmi and Srikanth. Sivaangi Krishnakumar was also announced in an undisclosed role. Pugazh later joined the cast in the role of a hacker, a character not present in the original film, and Thalaivasal Vijay said he would be reprising Vennira Aadai Moorthy's role. By 11 August, filming was 80% complete. Most of the film was shot on a bungalow set erected by art director Rajkumar at East Coast Road. Filming wrapped by 23 August within 35 working days.

Soundtrack 
The soundtrack is composed by debutant Raj Pratap, replacing Kannan (not the director) who was originally announced as composer. It features a remix of "Jambulingame Jadaadaraa" from the original film.

Release 
Kasethan Kadavulada was initially scheduled for 7 October 2022, but was postponed, reportedly due to the success of Ponniyin Selvan: I resulting in non-availability of screens for other films. It was later scheduled to release in theatres on 23 December 2022, and later 10 February 2023, but has since been indefinitely delayed due to legal and financial issues. The film's post-theatrical television satellite rights were sold to Sun TV and the digital rights to Sun NXT.

References

External links 
 

Films directed by R. Kannan
Indian comedy films
Indian heist films
Remakes of Indian films
Upcoming films
Upcoming Tamil-language films